is a railway station in Kurashiki, Okayama, Japan, operated by West Japan Railway Company (JR West).

Lines
Shin-Kurashiki Station is served by the high-speed Sanyo Shinkansen line and local Sanyo Main Line.

As Shin-Kurashiki is a minor intermediate shinkansen station, only Kodama all-stations services stop here.

Adjacent stations

History
It was renamed Shin-Kurashiki on 10 March 1975 at the same time the Shinkansen line opened.

References

External links

 JR West station information 

Railway stations in Okayama Prefecture
Sanyō Main Line
Sanyō Shinkansen
Railway stations in Japan opened in 1891
Kurashiki